Pyroderces ocreella is a moth in the family Cosmopterigidae. It is found in Madagascar.

This species has a wingspan of 12mm and a winglength of 5.5mm. The forewings are ochreous and the base black.

References

Natural History Museum Lepidoptera generic names catalog

ocreella
Moths described in 1955